The Bahamas, officially the Commonwealth of The Bahamas, competed at the 2020 Summer Olympics in Tokyo, Japan. Originally scheduled to take place from 24 July to 9 August 2020, the Games have been postponed to 23 July to 8 August 2021, because of the COVID-19 pandemic. It was the nation's eighteenth consecutive appearance at the Summer Olympics.

Medalists

Competitors
The following is the list of number of competitors in the Games.

Athletics

Bahamian athletes achieved the entry standards, either by qualifying time or by world ranking, in the following track and field events (up to a maximum of 3 athletes in each event):

Track & road events
Men

Women

Field events

Swimming

The Bahamas received a universality invitation from FINA to send two top-ranked swimmers (one per gender) in their respective individual events to the Olympics, based on the FINA Points System of June 28, 2021.

See also
Bahamas at the 2019 Pan American Games

References

Nations at the 2020 Summer Olympics
2020
2021 in Bahamian sport